was a Japanese noble and poet of the Nara period. He was the son of Fujiwara no Maro, and, according to the genealogy book Sonpi Bunmyaku, his mother was Uneme of Yakami no Kōri, Inaba Province, who is probably the same person who had a famous affair with Aki no Ōkimi. The collection of Japanese poems Man'yōshū does not include his works. With an unknown woman he had a son , among other children with other women. The footnote of Sonpi Bunmyaku, however, notes that Toyohiko is actually the grandson of Hamanari.

Life 
As the heir of his father Maro, the founder of the Kyōke, Hamanari was a central figure of that clan. However, he was almost a generation younger than the second heads of the Nanke, Hokke, and Shikike, and this left him always a step behind their advancement.

Under Empress Kōken, he held high-level positions in various ministries, but his promotion stagnated at this rank until Fujiwara no Nakamaro's rebellion in 764. He supported Empress Kōken's side in the conflict, and was promoted to  a month later.

In 773, Emperor Kōnin's heir  was disinherited, and according to the rekishi monogatari Mizukagami, Hamanari opposed Fujiwara no Momokawa's candidate Prince Yamabe, the future Emperor Kanmu, in favor of his brother by another mother, on the grounds that Yamabe's mother was descended from immigrants from Baekje.

In 781, after Emperor Kanmu assumed the throne, Hamanari was assigned away from the capital as director of the Dazaifu. Two months later, he was demoted within that body, had his retainers reduced from ten people to three and his stipend reduced by two-thirds, and was commanded to stop performing his actual duties and leave them to his supposed subordinate. This was likely intended by Kanmu to set an example for his opposition, and perhaps also as retribution. In 782, Hamanari's son-in-law Higami no Kawatsugu rebelled, and Hamanari was implicated and stripped of his high position as sangi. He was never able to return to the center of government. Hamanari died in the Daizaifu in 790, at the age of 67.

Personality 

Hamanari was well-read, and practiced divination and onmyōdō. He held positions in various ministries, but was unable to produce any impressive results. According to the Shoku Nihongi, this brought suffering to his subordinates and the people.

For poetics, he is best known for Kakyō Hyōshiki, the oldest extant piece of Japanese poetic criticism. In it, he attempts to apply phonetic rules of Chinese poetry to Japanese poetry.

See also
 8th century in poetry
 Japanese poetry

References

Further reading
JSTOR Wasp Waists and Monkey Tails: A Study and Translation of Hamanari's Uta no Shiki (The Code of Poetry, 772), Also Known as Kakyo Hyoshiki (A Formulary for Verse Based on The Canons of Poetry) - Judith Rabinovitch - Harvard Journal of Asiatic Studies, Vol. 51, No. 2 (Dec., 1991), pp. 471–560 -  (Fujiwara no Hamanari is mentioned in the first sentence of the first of the 90 pages of this article. This first page is at this link and is free.)

Fujiwara clan
724 births
790 deaths
Japanese male poets
People of Nara-period Japan
8th-century Japanese poets